The Tucker Fire was a wildfire that burned near Clear Lake National Wildlife Refuge in Modoc County, California  in the United States. The fire ignited on Sunday, July 28, 2019 along Highway 139 and went on to burn an estimated 14,217 acres of land. As of August 15, the fire was 95% contained. Officials say the wildfire was caused by traffic on Highway 139.

Events
Throughout its run, the fire did not impact any structures of note however did directly impact large transmission lines within the fire area.

Early Monday, July 29, the fire had grown to an estimated . Later that day, the fire spotted outside of control lines and proceeded to balloon in size to over  throughout that afternoon due to warm and dry weather conditions, burning predominantly northeast towards Clear Lake Reservoir. During that time, residents along County Road 114/202, Coyote Butte and the Horse Mountain areas were put under a fire warning, but not under any evacuation warning. Late Monday evening, as the blaze made its way to a nature fire break in the Clear Lake Reservoir, fire crews conducted burn-out operations to corral the flare up wherever necessary. By this time over 500 firefighters where actively engaging the fire.

By Tuesday, July 30, the Tucker Fire had not displayed any erratic behavior as it had the previous two days of burning and was estimated to be  with at least 10% containment.

Cause
The U.S. Forest Service cited that, much like two previous fires in the Modoc County area during the summer fire season, the Tucker fires ignition was directly human-caused, however unintentionally. No further details have been reported on the specifics of the fires ignition as of this time.

References

2019 California wildfires
July 2019 events in the United States
Wildfires in Modoc County, California